Khajuri Kamsar is a common place name in parts of India and Nepal, it may refer to:

 Khajuri, Bhopal, a village in Bhopal district, Madhya Pradesh, India
 Khajuri, Dildarnagar, a village in Dildarnagar Kamsar, Uttar Pradesh, India
 Khajuri, Gulbarga, a village in Gulbarga district of Karnataka, India
 Khajuri, Haryana,  a village in Yamuna Nagar district, Haryana, India
 Khajuri Chanha, a village development committee in Dhanusa District, Nepal 
 Khajuri Kalan, a village of Allahabad district, Uttar Pradesh, India
 Khajuri Khurd, a village of Allahabad district, Uttar Pradesh, India
 Khajuri Kamsar, a village of Ghazipur district, Uttar Pradesh, India
 Khajuri, Raebareli, a village in Raebareli district, Uttar Pradesh, India

See also
 Khajuria